Milk River is a town in Alberta, Canada that is named after the Milk River which flows immediately to its south. This location results in Milk River being one of the few Canadian communities within the Mississippi River drainage system. It is primarily a service centre for the many farms and cattle ranches which surround it.

History 
The Milk River area was first settled around the beginning of the 20th century. Milk River was incorporated as a village on July 31, 1916, and then a town on March 15, 1956.

The town's motto, "Under Eight Flags", refers to the area having been under the flags of seven governments as well as the Hudson's Bay Company. Including the Hudson's Bay Company's flag (1818–1869), the eight flags are France (1682–1760), the Spanish Empire (1769–1801), the French Republic (1801–1803), the United States (1803–1818), the British Empire (1869–1945), the Canadian Red Ensign (1945–1965), and the current Canadian Maple Leaf (1965–present).

Geography

Climate 

Milk River has a humid continental climate (Dfb) and enjoys some of the warmest summers in Alberta, along with milder winters.

Demographics 

In the 2016 Census of Population conducted by Statistics Canada, the Town of Milk River recorded a population of 827 living in 375 of its 420 total private dwellings, a  change from its 2011 population of 811.

Attractions 
Recreation venues in Milk River include a nine-hole golf course, curling rink, swimming pool and skateboard park.

Rafting and canoeing the Milk River is possible in the spring months; in summer and fall river flow levels drop such that reliable canoeing and rafting cannot be had. River access can be found at Under 8 Flags Campground within the Town of Milk River, Goldsprings Park to the south of Milk River, and various bridges to the east of Milk River.

Attractions within the surrounding region that are proximate to Milk River include the following.

Devil's Coulee Dinosaur Heritage Museum

The Devil's Coulee Dinosaur Heritage Museum features a Hadrosaur (duck-billed dinosaur) nest and embryo, ancient fossils, dinosaur models.

Writing On Stone Provincial Park

Writing-on-Stone Provincial Park, is one of the largest areas of protected prairie in the Alberta park system, and serves as both a nature preserve and protection for the largest concentration of rock art, created by Plains People. There are over 50 rock art sites, with thousands of figures, as well as numerous archeological sites. The park is located approximately 40 km east of Milk River.

Government 
The town is governed by a town council composed of a mayor and four councillors. Municipal elections are held every four years.

Infrastructure 
The town is connected to two highways: Highway 4, which heads south to Interstate 15 and north to Lethbridge, and Highway 501, which heads west to Cardston and east to Saskatchewan. Air service is provided by Milk River Airport and rail service is offered through Canadian Pacific Railway.

Milk River Health Centre 

Health services are provided by the Milk River and District Health Centre. The hospital offers 24/7 emergency department services with on call laboratory and diagnostic imaging services. Between 2005 and 2008, the emergency department averaged 1,351 visits per year.  The tertiary referral centre for the hospital is Chinook Regional Hospital in Lethbridge.

Education 
Milk River has two schools – Milk River Elementary School and Erle Rivers High School.

Media 
The Milk River Review was a weekly newspaper that was published between November 11, 1948 and May 27, 1954. It continued as a weekly throughout its run as The Review from June 17, 1954 to August 21, 1958, and again under the title of County of Warner Review and Advertiser between September 1, 1958 and March 30, 1961. Finally, the weekly newspaper returned to its original name, running as the Milk River Review from June 1, 1961 through to November 16, 1961.

See also 
 List of communities in Alberta
 List of towns in Alberta

References

External links 

1916 establishments in Alberta
County of Warner No. 5
Towns in Alberta